The Widnes Laboratory was a research institute in northern Cheshire, run by Imperial Chemical Industries.

History

The site opened in 1891 as the Central Laboratory.

On Monday 7 August 1950, an explosion at the site killed one man and injured another.

Discovery of halothane
Work was carried out at Widnes Laboratory from 1951 to 1956 which led to the discovery of halothane in 1955. Halothane gas was the most common anaesthetic for many years.

There had been deaths with halothane and liver damage, and was discontinued from the 1980s. Anaesthetic deployment in hospitals is mostly with intravenous compounds and then isoflurane gas, discovered by Ross Terrell in the US.

Structure
The site was demolished, and now lies under the A533.

See also
 Winnington Laboratory, also ICI

References

External links
 Imperial War Museum

1891 establishments in England
Chemical industry in the United Kingdom
Chemical research institutes
Imperial Chemical Industries
Research institutes established in 1891
Research institutes in Cheshire
Widnes